Austin Catholic High School (ACHS) is a private, Roman Catholic, co-educational, college-preparatory high school in Chesterfield, Michigan, United States. It was established in 2011 and is part of the Roman Catholic Archdiocese of Detroit.

References

External links 
 

Roman Catholic Archdiocese of Detroit
Schools in Macomb County, Michigan
Catholic secondary schools in Michigan
Preparatory schools in Michigan
Educational institutions established in 2011
2011 establishments in Michigan